Catherine Gutierrez (born  on May 2, 1976), known professionally as Alicia Mayer, is a former model and actress from the Philippines.

Biography 

She was one of the hosts of the longest noon-time variety show, Eat Bulaga!. She was the Cover Girl of FHM 2003. Among Mayer's more notable roles was being on the cast of the comedy show Lagot Ka, Isusumbong Kita and the antagonist "Julianna" in the afternoon soap opera Saang Sulok ng Langit. She went to the cast of Muli, a Filipino-Malaysian soap opera playing the role of Rhea. Alicia who is a vegetarian recently became a spokesperson for PETA. She posed in front of photographers from all over the world wearing nothing but a bikini made of lettuce during her campaign for PETA. Alicia Mayer was originally discovered from her own self managed Internet website in 2002 under the name screen name Alicia Bonifacio.

Filmography

Drama and Host

Movies

References

External links 

 

Filipino film actresses
Living people
People from Olongapo
Actresses from Zambales
Filipino female models
1976 births
Filipino television actresses